David Baird may refer to:

 Sir David Baird, 1st Baronet (1757–1829), British general
 Sir David Baird, 2nd Baronet (1795–1852), captain in the British army
 David Baird (author) (born 1956), Canadian author, composer and theatre director
 David Baird Sr. (1839–1927), U.S. Senator from New Jersey
 David Baird Jr. (1881–1955), his son, U.S. Senator from New Jersey
 David McCurdy Baird (1920–2019), Canadian geologist
 David Graham Baird (1854–1913), American chess master
 Davie Baird (1869–1946), Scottish international footballer

See also
 Baird (surname)